This is a list of bridges and tunnels on the National Register of Historic Places in the U.S. state of Colorado.

Studies of Colorado's historic bridges, to assess which ones could qualify for National Register listing, were conducted in 1983, 1987, 2000, and 2011.  The latter study evaluated "712 bridges and grade separations" which had been built during 1959 to 1968.

References

 
Colorado
Bridges
Bridges